Lachnogyini is a tribe of darkling beetles in the subfamily Pimeliinae of the family Tenebrionidae. There are at least three genera in Lachnogyini.

Genera
These genera belong to the tribe Lachnogyini
 Lachnodactylus Seidlitz, 1898  (the Palearctic)
 Lachnogya Ménétriés, 1849  (the Palearctic and Indomalaya)
 Netuschilia Reitter, 1904  (the Palearctic)

References

Further reading

 
 

Tenebrionoidea
Beetle tribes